The Harleian Library, Harley Collection, Harleian Collection and other variants is one of the main "closed" collections (namely, historic collections to which new material is no longer added) of the British Library in London, formerly the library of the British Museum.

The collection comprises 7,660 manuscripts, including 2,200 illuminated manuscripts, more than 14,000 original legal documents; and more than 500 rolls. It was assembled by Robert Harley (1661–1724) and his son Edward (1689–1741). In 1753, it was purchased for £10,000 by the British government. Together with the collections of Sir Robert Cotton (the Cotton library) and Hans Sloane (the Sloane library) it formed the basis of the British Museum's collection of manuscripts, which were transferred to the new British Library in 1973.

The collection contains illuminated manuscripts spanning the early Middle Ages to the Renaissance. There are important early British manuscripts, many from Western Europe, and several Byzantine manuscripts in Greek and other languages.

Manuscripts

Among the most significant manuscripts are: 
Lacnunga (Harley MS 585)
Harley Psalter (Harley MS 603)
Kildare Poems (Harley MS 913)
Annales Cambriae, in Harley MS 3859; including mediæval Welsh genealogies et al
Sumer Is Icumen In, in Harley MS 978
Inventory of Henry VIII of England (Harley MS 1419)
Gospels of Mael Brigte (Harley MS 1602)
Harley 1775, an illuminated Gospel Book produced in Italy during the last quarter of the 6th century
Minuscule 113 (Harley MS 1810) - and many others, see the category at bottom of the page
Harley Lyrics (Harley MS 2253)
Harley Golden Gospels (Harley MS 2788)
Ramsey Psalter (Harley MS 2904)
Book of Nunnaminster (Harley MS 2965)
Minuscule 3686
Harleian Genealogies (Harley MS 3859)
Minuscule 104 (Harley MS 5537)
Minuscule 505 (Harley MS 5538)
Uncial 0121a (Harley MS 5613)
Ptolemy's Geography (Harley MS 7182 & 7195)
Harley MS 7334
Harleian prayerbook (Harley MS 7653)

References

Further reading
 British Library Journal vol. 15 (1989) is devoted to Robert Harley and his collections.
 C. E. and C. R. Wright, eds. The Diary of Humfrey Wanley 1715–1726, 2 vols (London, 1966).

Catalogue
  (4 vols): vol. 1; vol. 2; vol. 3; vol. 4 (indexes)

External links

The foundation collections at the Catalogue of Illuminated manuscripts
List of medicine and alchemist manuscripts PDF, 192 KB
Trilingual Psalter
Harley Bestiary (Harley MS 4751)
The Book of Nunnaminster (Harley 2965)

1753 establishments in England

Archives in the London Borough of Camden